Three ships of the United States Navy have been named USS Michigan in honor of the 26th state.

  was the U.S. Navy's first iron-hulled warship.  Launched in 1843, she operated on the Great Lakes for her entire career, was later renamed Wolverine and was decommissioned in 1912.
  was a  that saw action against Mexico and escorted convoys during World War I.
She was converted into a guided missile submarine (SSGN) in 2006 and is currently in active service.

United States Navy ship names